The 1946 Drake Bulldogs football team was an American football team that represented Drake University as a member of the Missouri Valley Conference (MVC) during the 1946 college football season. In their 14th and final season under head coach Vee Green, the Bulldogs compiled a 2–6–1 record (0–4 against MVC opponents), finished last in the conference, and were outscored by a total of 247 to 78. The team played its home games at Drake Stadium in Des Moines, Iowa.

Schedule

References

Drake
Drake Bulldogs football seasons
Drake Bulldogs football